FG (commonly called Les Sucettes after the fifth track on the side B) is the sixth album by French singer France Gall where she is accompanied by Alain Goraguer and His Orchestra. It was released in November 1966.

Track listing

References

1966 albums
Philips Records albums
France Gall albums